Apple Box is a box set by XTC compiling Apple Venus Volume 1 and Wasp Star (Apple Venus Volume 2) along with their respective demo albums Homespun and Homegrown. It is the third box set of their career following Transistor Blast: The Best of the BBC Sessions and Coat of Many Cupboards, released by Idea Records.

Track listing

UK CD: IDEACD 007
All songs written by Andy Partridge, except where noted.

Apple Venus Volume 1
"River of Orchids" – 5:53
"I'd Like That" – 3:50
"Easter Theatre" – 4:37
"Knights in Shining Karma" – 3:39
"Frivolous Tonight (Colin Moulding) – 3:09
"Greenman" – 6:17
"Your Dictionary" – 3:14
"Fruit Nut" (Moulding) – 3:01
"I Can't Own Her" – 5:26
"Harvest Festival" – 4:15
"The Last Balloon" – 6:39

Wasp Star (Apple Venus Volume 2)
"Playground" – 4:17
"Stupidly Happy" – 4:13
"In Another Life" (Moulding) – 3:35
"My Brown Guitar" – 3:51
"Boarded Up" (Moulding) – 3:23
"I'm the Man Who Murdered Love" – 3:44
"We're All Light" – 4:39
"Standing in for Joe" (Moulding) – 3:42
"Wounded Horse" – 4:11
"You and the Clouds Will Still Be Beautiful" – 4:18
"Church of Women" – 5:06
"The Wheel and the Maypole" – 5:55

Homespun
"River of Orchids" – 4:10
"I'd Like That" – 4:47
"Easter Theatre" – 4:52
"Knights in Shining Karma" – 3:38
"Frivolous Tonight (Moulding) – 3:06
"Greenman" – 6:01
"Your Dictionary" – 3:14
"Fruit Nut" (Moulding) – 2:44
"I Can't Own Her" – 5:06
"Harvest Festival" – 5:17
"The Last Balloon" – 5:17

Homegrown
"Playground" – 4:25
"Stupidly Happy" – 3:45
"In Another Life" (Excerpt of original demo) (Colin Moulding) – 2:02
"In Another Life" (Jug band version) (Moulding) – 3:44
"Some Lovely" – 3:57
"Boarded Up" (Moulding) – 2:56
"I'm the Man Who Murdered Love" (Early 'other song' cassette idea) – 2:36
"I'm the Man Who Murdered Love" (Tamla version excerpt) – 0:39
"I'm the Man Who Murdered Love" – 3:33
"We're All Light" (Early cassette idea) – 1:14
"We're All Light" – 4:32
"Standing in for Joe" (Lounge version) (Moulding) – 2:41
"Standing in for Joe" (Moulding) – 3:34
"Wounded Horse" – 4:22
"You and the Clouds Will Still Be Beautiful" – 3:46
"Lie for a Lie" (Cassette demo) – 1:43
"Church of Women" – 4:36
"The Pot Won't Hold Our Love" (Early cassette idea) – 1:38
"Everything Decays" (Early cassette idea) – 2:26
"The Wheel and the Maypole" – 5:33

Purchase of the box set also provides instructions for downloading two non-album XTC tracks:
"Spiral" (Partridge)
"Say It" (Moulding)

Personnel
Peter Ashworth – photography
Ian Cooper – mastering
Steve Gullick – photography
Valerie Phillips – photography
Andrew Swainson – design

Apple Venus Volume 1
XTC
Dave Gregory – piano, keyboards, keyboard programming, guitars, backing vocals (Gregory left the band during recording)
Colin Moulding – vocals, bass guitar
Andy Partridge – vocals, guitars

Additional musicians
Mike Batt – orchestral arrangements for "Greenman" and "I Can't Own Her"
Haydn Bendall – keyboards
Guy Barker – trumpet and flugelhorn solo on "The Last Balloon"
Nick Davis – keyboards
Prairie Prince – drums, percussion
Steve Sidwell – trumpet solo on "Easter Theatre"
All arrangements played by The London Sessions Orchestra under their leader Gavin Wright

Production
Haydn Bendall – original production, engineering
Nick Davis – additional production, engineering, mix
Simon Dawson – mix assistance
Alan Douglas – recording engineer
Barry Hammond – recording engineer
Tim Young – mastering

Wasp Star (Apple Venus Volume 2)
XTC
Colin Moulding – vocals, bass guitar
Andy Partridge – vocals, guitar

Additional musicians
Caroline Dale – cello
Nick Davis – keyboards
Simon Gardner – flugelhorn
Patrick Kiernan – violin
Peter Lale – viola
Holly Partridge – backing vocals on "Playground"
Prairie Prince – drums (2, 3, 4, 12)
Chuck Sabo – drums (1, 6, 7, 8, 9, 10, 11)
Kate St. John – oboe
Matt Vaughn – programming
Gavin Wright – violin

Production
Haydn Bendall – recording engineering
Nick Davis – producer, mixing, recording engineering
Simon Dawson – mix engineer
Alan Douglas – recording engineering
Barry Hammond – recording engineering
Bob Ludwig – mastering

Homespun and Homegrown
Andy Partridge
Colin Moulding

References

Albums produced by Nick Davis (record producer)
Idea Records albums
XTC compilation albums
2005 compilation albums